Huaca Huallamarca (possibly from Quechua wak'a a local god of protection, a sacred object or place / sacred, Walla a people, marka village) also known as Huaca Pan de Azúcar (possibly from Spanish pan de azúcar sugar loaf), is an archaeological site in Peru. It is located in the district of San Isidro, in the city of Lima.

See also 
List of buildings in Lima

References 

Archaeological sites in Peru
Lima Province
Archaeological sites in Lima Region